Nathan is a surname.  It is derived from the Hebrew verb נתן meaning gave (standard Hebrew Natan, Yiddish Nussen or Nosson, Tiberian Hebrew Nāṯān).  The meaning of the name in Jewish culture could be rendered "he has given" or "he will give".

People with this surname 
 Abie Nathan (1927–2008), Israeli humanist and peace activist
 Barnett Nathan (1793–1856), English impresario and entertainer
 Baron Nathan, a title in the Peerage of the United Kingdom, created in 1940
 Harry Nathan, 1st Baron Nathan (1889–1963)
 Roger Nathan, 2nd Baron Nathan (1922–2007)
 Rupert Nathan, 3rd Baron Nathan (born 1957)
 Clemens Nathan (1933-2015), British humanitarian
 DeDee Nathan (born 1968), American heptathlete
 Elias Salomon Nathan (1807–1862), German writer and physician
 Ernesto Nathan (1848–1921), English-Italian politician and mayor of Rome (1907–1913)
 George Nathan (1895-1937), British volunteer and battalion commander in the International Brigades
 George Jean Nathan (1888 – 1958) American critic and editor
 Henry Nathan Jr. (1842–1914), Canadian politician
 Isaac Nathan ben Kalonymus (14th-15th century), French philosopher and rabbi
 Isaac Nathan (c. 1792–1864), English-Australian musician
 Jared Nathan (1985-2006), American child actor
 Joe Nathan (born 1974), American baseball player
 John Nathan (born 1940), American professor of Japanese
 Manfred Nathan (1875–1945) South African lawyer, judge, and writer.
 Matthew Nathan (1862-1939), governor of Hong Kong (1904-1907)
 Maud Nathan (1862–1946), American social worker, labor activist and suffragist
 Micah Nathan (born 1973), American author
 Michelle Vicki Nathan (born 1950), birth name of the British actress Vicki Michelle
 Pareaute Nathan, New Zealand Māori educator and weaver
 P.S. Nathan (1891–1976), Indian natural history specimen dealer
 Robert Nathan (1894–1985), American novelist and poet
 Robert Nathan (intelligence officer) (1868–1921), British intelligence official active in India and the United States
 Robert R. Nathan (1908–2001), American economist
 Robert Stuart Nathan (born 1948), American television writer and produce
 Sara Nathan (broadcaster) (born 1956), English broadcaster
 Sara Nathan (journalist) (born 1974), English journalist
 Sellapan Ramanathan (1924-2016), 6th President of Singapore (1999-2011), often known as S R Nathan
 Syd Nathan (1904–1968), American music business executive
 Tonie Nathan (1923–2014), American politician
 Tony Nathan (born 1956), American football coach

Fictional characters 
 Gloria Nathan, a Latin American doctor at HBO drama Oz

See also
Nathan (given name)
Nathan (disambiguation) (places and other meanings)

References

Jewish surnames
English-language surnames

de:Nathan
fr:Nathan
ja:ネイサン